Lucky Jim is a 1957 British comedy film directed by John Boulting and starring Ian Carmichael, Terry-Thomas and Hugh Griffith. It is an adaptation of the 1954 novel Lucky Jim by Kingsley Amis.

Plot
Jim Dixon is a young lecturer in history at a redbrick university, who manages to offend his head of department and create various disastrous incidents. When he eventually delivers a lecture drunk, he feels forced to resign. But just as his career seems over, he is offered a job in London, and when he learns that the girl of his dreams is on her way to the railway station, he chases after her in the professor's old car. The professor's whole family chases after, and arrives at the station just in time to see Jim and the girl disappear on the train to London.

Main cast

 Ian Carmichael - James "Jim" Dixon
 Terry-Thomas - Bertrand Welch
 Hugh Griffith - Professor Welch
 Sharon Acker - Christine Callaghan
 Jean Anderson - Mrs Welch
 Maureen Connell - Margaret Peel
 Clive Morton - Sir Hector Gore-Urquhart
 John Welsh - The Principal
 Reginald Beckwith - University Porter
 Kenneth Griffith - Cyril Johns
 Jeremy Hawk - Bill Atkinson
 Ronald Cardew - Registrar
 Penny Morrell - Miss Wilson
 John Cairney - Roberts
 Ian Wilson - Glee Singer
 Charles Lamb - Contractor
 Henry B. Longhurst - Professor Hutchinson
 Jeremy Longhurst - Waiter

Reception
According to Kinematograph Weekly the film was "in the money" at the British box office in 1957.

The film critic writing for The Times, gave the film a mixed review after the UK premiere in September 1957, stating that the film, "carries over enough gusto from the original to be funnier than the usual run of British comedies, without managing to avoid lapses into incoherence through pressing the Joke too far."

When the film premiered in the United States a year later, Howard Thompson of The New York Times described Ian Carmichael as "an English answer to Jerry Lewis": "let's fervently hope this stale attempt at mirth, furiously sliding back and forth from leaden coyness to plain custard-pie confusion, doesn't mean the end of all the sly, civilized fun we've come to expect from the British specialists."

In his 2010 obituary of Ian Carmichael, Guardian contributor Dennis Barker wrote: "One of his most characteristic and memorable sorties... was his portrayal of Kingsley Amis's Lucky Jim—the anti-hero James Dixon, who savaged the pretensions of academia, as Amis had himself sometimes clashed with academia when he was a lecturer at Swansea. Appearing in John and Roy Boulting's 1957 film, he was able to suggest an unruly but amiable spirit at the end of its tether, his great horsey teeth exposed in the strained grimace that often greeted disaster."

Song
The film's end titles credit "the voice of Al Fernhead" with singing the distinctive repeated "O Lucky Jim" phrase, from the eponymous song whose composers are credited as Fred V. Bowers and Charles Horwitz. The Bowers–Horwitz song "Ah, lucky Jim"  inspired the book's title.

References

External links
 
 
 

1957 films
1957 comedy films
1950s satirical films
British comedy films
British satirical films
1950s English-language films
Films based on works by Kingsley Amis
Films directed by John Boulting
Films scored by John Addison
Films set in universities and colleges
Films shot at MGM-British Studios
1950s British films